Leitir Mhic an Bhaird or Leitir Mhic a' Bhaird (anglicised as Lettermacaward) is a Gaeltacht village in the Rosses region of County Donegal, Ireland. The village, known colloquially as Leitir (pronounced letcher), is between the larger towns of Glenties and Dungloe. It is also a civil parish in the historic barony of Boylagh.

Irish language
There are approximately 650 people living in the Leitir Mhic an Bhaird ED and 19% Irish speakers.

Amenities
The village has two shops, 'Clerkin's', a family run service station, and 'Gallagher's Stop & Shop'. There are 3 pubs; Elliott's, the Gweebarra Bar and Packie's Bar.

Sport
The local Gaelic games club is Na Rossa.

Civil parish of Lettermacaward
The civil parish contains the village of Lettermacaward.

Townlands
The civil parish contains the following townlands:

Befflaght
Bellanaboy (also known as Derrynacarrow East)
Boyoughter
Commeen
Cor
Derryleconnell Far
Derryleconnell Near
Derrynacarrow
Derrynacarrow East (also known as Bellanaboy)
Derrynagrial
Derrynanaspol
Dooey
Farragans
Galwolie
Glebe
Longfield
Madavagh
Meenacarn
Meenagowan
Ranny
Stranasaggart
Toome

See also
 List of populated places in Ireland

References

External links
Further information on the area
Irish language study 2006

 
Gaeltacht places in County Donegal
Gaeltacht towns and villages
The Rosses
Towns and villages in County Donegal